Moo shu pork (木须肉, also spelled mù xū ròu, moo shi pork, mu shu or mu xu pork) is a dish of northern Chinese origin, originating from Shandong.  It invariably contains egg, whose yellow color is reminiscent of blossoms of the osmanthus tree, after which the dish is named.

Description

Chinese 
In its traditional Chinese version, moo shu pork consists of sliced pork tenderloin, cucumber, and scrambled eggs, stir fried in lard together with bite-sized cuttings of wood ear mushrooms (black fungus) and enoki mushrooms. Historically the original dish in Shandong cuisine contained bamboo shoots.  It was adapted into Beijing cuisine replacing bamboo with crunchy daylily blossoms. When home-cooked either may be replaced with cucumber. The dish is seasoned with minced ginger and garlic, scallions, soy sauce, and rice cooking wine (usually huangjiu).  The dish is traditionally eaten by itself.

American Chinese 

The dish is prepared with julienned pork, cabbage, scrambled egg, carrots, and wood ear mushrooms (black fungus).  Hoisin sauce is painted on the inside of a thin flour-and-water pancake, or recently, sometimes, a Mexican tortilla, which is then used to wrap the filling.

In the United States, the dish seems to have appeared in Chinese restaurants in New York City and Washington, D.C. in approximately 1966, receiving mention in a New York Times guide to Washington restaurants published that year. One of the first restaurants in Manhattan to serve the dish was Pearl's, one of the best known New York City Chinese restaurants to serve non-Cantonese food in the 1960s. A 1967 article in The New York Times states that another of the first restaurateurs to serve the dish in Manhattan was Emily Kwoh, the owner of the Mandarin House, Mandarin East, and Great Shanghai restaurants.

See also

 List of pork dishes

References

American Chinese cuisine
Egg dishes
Pork dishes
Shandong cuisine